Sarah Magdalena Biasini (born 21 July 1977) is a French actress, the daughter of actress Romy Schneider and her second husband and former private secretary .

Career
Biasini studied art history at the Sorbonne in Paris and theater at the Lee Strasberg Institute in Los Angeles and the Actors Studio in New York City.

She made her acting debut in 2004, starring in the Emmy-nominated French mini-series , a swashbuckling adventure story loosely based on the life of the sword-wielding 17th-century opera star Julie d'Aubigny (Mlle. Maupin). In 2005, she made her stage debut in Barefoot in the Park at the Théâtre Marigny in Paris.

Biasini wrote a book called, "La beauté du ciel," which was published in January 2021. The book is based on Biasini's family and her mother.

Selected filmography 
 Mon petit doigt m'a dit... (2005)
 A Man and His Dog (2009)
  (2013)

Bibliography

References

External links

1977 births
University of Paris alumni
French film actresses
French stage actresses
French television actresses
French people of Austrian descent
French people of German descent
French people of Italian descent
Living people
Lee Strasberg Theatre and Film Institute alumni
Actors Studio alumni
People from Var (department)
21st-century French actresses